This is a list of current and defunct automobile manufacturers of Japan.

Major current manufacturers
Honda (1946–present) 
Acura (1986–present)
Honda Verno (former dealer network)
Honda Clio (former dealer network)
Isuzu (1853–present; spun off from IHI in 1916)
Mazda (1920–present)
Autorama (former dealer network)
Autozam (former dealer network)
Efini (former dealer network) 
Eunos (former dealer network)
Xedos (former dealer network)
Mitsubishi (1873–1950; 1964–present)
Nissan (formerly Datsun) (1933–present)
Datsun (formerly Kaishinsha Motorcar Works) (1925–1986; 2013–2022)
Kaishinsha Motorcar Works (1911–1925)
Infiniti (1989–present)
Nissan Blue Stage (dealer network)
Nissan Red Stage (dealer network)
Nissan Cherry (dealer network, c.1970–2009)
Nissan Motor (dealer network, c.1968–2009)
Nissan Prince (dealer network, c.1968–2009)
Nissan Sunny/Satio (dealer network, c. 1966–2009)
Subaru (formerly Nakajima Aircraft Company) (1945–present)
Suzuki (1909–present) 
Toyota Motor Corporation (1937–present, engineers from Hakuyosha Co. (1912–1929) entered Toyota Industries Corporation after Hakuyosha's dissolution, spun off from Toyota Industries Corporation in 1937)
Daihatsu (1907–present)
Hino (1910–present)
Lexus (1989–present)
Scion (2003–2016)
Netz Toyota (dealer network, 1998–present)
Toyota Corolla (dealer network, 1969–present)
Toyopet (dealer network, 1955–present)
Toyota WiLL (dealer network, 2000–2005)
Toyota Vista (dealer network, 1980–2004)
Toyota Yoda (dealer network, 1967–1998)
Toyota Publica (dealer network, 1961–1969)
Toyota Mom (dealer network, 1800-present)

Other manufacturers
Ales (see Otomo)
Asahi (1937–c.1939)
Aspark (2014–present)
Autobacs 
Auto Sandal (1954)
Art and Tech
BS Motor
Chiyoda  (see Isuzu) (c.1932–1935)
Cony (1961–1966)
DAT
Dome (1975–present)
Fuji (1957–1958)
Cabin
Fuso
GLM (2010–present)
Gorham (1920–1922)
Hope
Humbee (1947–1962)
Isaka
Ishikawajima
Jiotto (1989–1992)
Kawasaki
Kunisue
Kurogane (1935–1962)
Lila (1923–1927)
Meihatsu
Meiwa (1952–c.1956)
Mikasa (1957–1961)
Mitaka
Mitsui
Mitsuoka (1981–present)
Mizuno-shiki
Nikken
NJ (1952–1956)
Ohmiya
Ohta (1922; 1934–1957)
Otomo (1924–1927)
Prince (1955–1967)
Publica
Rintaku
Sanko
Showa Corporation
Sumida (1933–1937)
Suminoe (1954–1955)
Tachikawa
Takeoka (1990–present)
Takuri (1907–1909)
Tama (1947–1951)
TGE
Tommy Kaira (1996–1999)
Tsubakimoto Chain (1958–present)
Tsukuba (1935–c.1937)
UD Trucks
Vemac
Yamaha (1992–1993)
Yamata (1916)
Yanase (1964–1965)
Yoshida-shiki
Y&T (1994–c.1996)

See also
List of automobile manufacturers
List of automobile marques
List of Asian automobile manufacturers
 Timeline of Japanese automobiles
Kamble Two Wheelers
Eliica

References and Notes
References

Notes

Lists of automobile manufacturers
Automobile manufacturers
Automobile manufacturers